Semaprochilodus is a genus of South American freshwater fish in the family Prochilodontidae. They have sometimes been included in the genus Prochilodus instead. Of the six species, three are from the Amazon Basin, two from the Orinoco Basin and a single from the Maroni Basin.

They support important fisheries and based on a review by IBAMA, they are the second (after Brachyplatystoma vaillantii) most caught fish by weight in the Brazilian Amazon.

Species
FishBase recognizes the following species in the genus:

 Semaprochilodus brama (Valenciennes, 1850)
 Semaprochilodus insignis (Jardine, 1841) (Kissing prochilodus) 
 Semaprochilodus kneri (Pellegrin, 1909)
 Semaprochilodus laticeps (Steindachner, 1879)
 Semaprochilodus taeniurus (Valenciennes, 1821) (Silver prochilodus)
 Semaprochilodus varii R. M. C. Castro, 1988

References

External links

Prochilodontidae
Taxa named by Henry Weed Fowler
Characiformes genera